Calm Before the Storm or The Calm Before the Storm may refer to:

Books, comics
 A History of Modern Tibet, Volume 2: The Calm Before the Storm: 1951-1955 by Melvyn Goldstein (2007)
 The Calm Before the Storm, history book by Itamar Singer
 The Calm Before the Storm, List of Star Wars comic books (section The Calm Before the Storm) 
 The Calm Before the Storm, Wraithborn Issue 4
 The Calm Before the Storm, List of Full Metal Panic! chapters
 The Calm Before the Storm, List of Wandering Son chapters (嵐の前の静けさ  "Arashi no Mae no Shizukesa")
 The Calm Before the Storm, List of Dragon Ball Z chapters (大対決戦前の休息 "Daikessen Mae no Kyūsoku")
 The Calm Before the Storm, List of Kokoro Library episodes
 The Calm Before the Storm, List of Whistle! chapters

Film, TV and entertainment
 The Calm Before the Storm: Under Review 1969-1971, DVD David Bowie discography
 The Calm Before the Storm, Gypsy Sisters episode, 2013
 The Calm Before the Storm, Vettai : Pledged to Hunt episode 53
 The Calm Before the Storm, List of Tiger & Bunny episodes
 The Calm Before the Storm, List of Spice and Wolf episodes
 The Calm Before the Storm, List of Cardcaptor Sakura episodes
 The Calm Before the Storm, List of A Little Princess Sara episodes
 The Calm Before the Storm, List of Beyblade episodes (Season 2)
 The Calm Before the Storm, List of Meerkat Manor episodes

Music

Albums
Calm Before the Storm (Venom album)
Calm Before the Storm (Paul Brandt album)
Calm Before the Storm (Jon English album), 1980
Calm Before the Storm (Lauren Harris album)
Calm Before the Storm (Dare album)
Calm Before the Storm, an album by Set It Off
Calm Before the Storm, an album by Brent Smedley
The Calm Before the Storm (Colton Dixon album), Colton Dixon album
The Calm Before the Storm (Tech N9ne album), Tech N9ne album
The Calm Before the Storm, mixtape by Ghetts
The Calm Before the Storm, Rafi Kirder and Sevan Kirder with Inish 2008 
Liverpool – The Calm Before the Storm, compilation album by The Real People
Storm Before Calm, album by Primordial (band) 2002
Calm Before ..., an album by the Rising Storm (Remnant Records 1967)

Songs
"Calm Before The Storm", by The Bats 1987
"Calm Before The Storm", by Eddie Money 1986
"Calm Before The Storm", by Jonathan Butler 1986
"Calm Before The Storm", by Sheena Easton, B-side of "Morning Train (Nine To Five)" 1981
"Calm Before The Storm", by Fall Out Boy
"The Calm Before The Storm", by Johnny Cooke	 
"The Calm Before the Storm", Sincere, feat. Chris Rene discography
"The Calm Before the Storm", by Sparks from Balls
"The Calm Before the Storm", B-side of "Se a vida é (That's the Way Life Is)" by Pet Shop Boys from Bilingual
"(This is Just) the Calm Before the Storm", single by Antony Harding
"The Calm Before the Storm", by Arcana from Dark Age of Reason
"The Calm Before the Storm", by Dreamscape from Everlight
"The Calm Before the Storm", by Hollenthon from With Vilest of Worms to Dwell
"The Calm Before the Storm", by Destruction from Inventor of Evil
"The Calm Before the Storm", by Rubén Blades from Nothing But the Truth
"The Calm Before the Storm", by Judas Priest from Nostradamus 
"Calm Before the Storm", by Darude from Before the Storm

See also
Calm After the Storm (disambiguation)